Monde, a French word meaning "world", is an orb located near the top of a crown.

Monde  or Le Monde may also refer to:

Monde (review), a weekly French magazine on international cultural and politics (published from 1928 to 1935)
Le Monde, a daily newspaper of record in France
Le Monde diplomatique, a monthly newspaper offering analysis and opinion
The World (Descartes), or Le monde, full title Traité du monde et de la lumière, a book by René Descartes
"Le monde" (song), 2014 song by M. Pokora
Leon Monde (1895–unknown), American basketball player
Monde Selection, food and drink, and cosmetics product quality award